Order is a 2005 Russian drama film directed by Vera Glagoleva.

Plot 
The film tells about a woman who leaves her husband, as a result of which she tries to commit suicide, but can't decide. Suddenly, several contract killings take place in front of her eyes and each time she sees the same man who is likely to commit these crimes and she orders him her murder.

Cast 
 Nataliya Vdovina as Anna
 Aleksandr Baluev as Oleg
 Larisa Guzeeva as Galya
 Vladimir Sterzhakov as Natan
 Aleksandr Yakovlev as Igor
 Anna Nosatova as Lena
 Leonid Anisimov
 Galina Kobzar-Slobodyuk as Yarofeyeva
 Aleksandr Nosovsky
 Vsevolod Kabanov

References

External links 
 

2005 films
2000s Russian-language films
Russian drama films
2005 drama films